Álvaro Velasco Roca (born 15 May 1981) is a Spanish professional golfer.

Velasco was born in Barcelona and attended Coastal Carolina University on a golf scholarship where he graduated with a degree in Business Administration. He turned professional in 2005 and worked his way through the ranks graduating to the top level European Tour in 2008.

Velasco finished 100th on the Order of Merit in 2008, but fell back to the second tier Challenge Tour in 2010 having finished 189th in the Race to Dubai rankings in 2009. He recorded the biggest win of his career at the 2010 Fred Olsen Challenge de España, before trumping this by winning the Kazakhstan Open, the Challenge Tour's biggest event. He would also win the Challenge Tour Rankings, to secure a return to the main tour.

At the 2018 Mediterranean Games, Velasco won a gold medal in the men's team competition.

Amateur wins
2001 Italian International Amateur Championship
2005 Spanish Amateur Closed Championship, Biarritz Cup

Professional wins (3)

Challenge Tour wins (3)

Challenge Tour playoff record (0–1)

Team appearances
Amateur
European Amateur Team Championship (representing Spain): 2005

See also
2007 Challenge Tour graduates
2010 Challenge Tour graduates

References

External links

Spanish male golfers
Golfers from Catalonia
Coastal Carolina Chanticleers men's golfers
European Tour golfers
Mediterranean Games gold medalists for Spain
Mediterranean Games medalists in golf
Competitors at the 2018 Mediterranean Games
Sportspeople from Barcelona
1981 births
Living people